"Bad Case of Loving You (Doctor, Doctor)" is a 1978 song, written and originally recorded by Moon Martin and sung a year later by Robert Palmer. The song became one of Palmer's definitive hits.

Background
Moon Martin originally recorded the song in 1978. Martin's record label Capitol Records released the song in the United Kingdom and Spain as a stand-alone vinyl single but inserted the song into the United States release of Martin's album Shots from a Cold Nightmare. His original recording did not enter the music charts.

Robert Palmer version
A year later, the song appeared on Robert Palmer's 1979 album Secrets. In Palmer's home country, the United Kingdom, the song debuted and peaked at #61 on the UK Singles Chart on July 7, 1979.

The version became more successful in other countries. In the United States, Palmer's version reached #14 on the Billboard Hot 100, #10 on the Cash Box Top 100, and #1 on the Canadian RPM chart in 1979. The Palmer version was remixed with heavier guitars and drums for his greatest hits collection Addictions: Volume 1. The song was nominated for Best Male Rock Vocal Performance at the 22nd Annual Grammy Awards. In the Netherlands, it reached #2 on the Dutch Top 40 chart on August 4, 1979, five weeks after its debut (July 7) on the chart. In New Zealand, it reached #20 in the Top 40 Singles Chart on the week of October 7, 1979, five weeks after its debut at #43 on the chart (September 9).

The song begins with a stanza written in typical eight-bar blues structure and chord sequence and then progresses to a 10-bar blues chorus.

Billboard reviewer Ed Harrison praised Palmer's rendition as "the kind of intelligent rock tune."

Other covers
Bad Company singer Paul Rodgers covered the song for the soundtrack of the 1992 slasher film Dr. Giggles.  Mexican-American singer Tatiana recorded a Spanish-language cover version in 1994 for her album Un Alma Desnuda and was released as the second single from the album. A cover version of the chorus also is part of the theme of the American syndicated series The Doctors.
Australian Adam Brand and the Outlaws covered the song on the 2016 album Adam Brand and the Outlaws.

Chart performance

Weekly charts

Year-end charts

References

1978 songs
1979 singles
Robert Palmer (singer) songs
Island Records singles
RPM Top Singles number-one singles